Sharmba David Mitchell (born August 27, 1970) is an American former professional boxer who competed from 1988 to 2006. He held the WBA light welterweight title from 1998 to 2001, and the IBF interim light welterweight title in 2004.

Professional career
Mitchell began his professional boxing career on September 23, 1988, knocking out Eddie Colón in three rounds at Atlantic City, New Jersey.

He had a mark of 14 wins and no losses with seven knockouts - including victories over former Olympic Games bronze medalist Aristides Acevedo and over Dana Roston - when he met a former or future world champion for the first time inside a ring. On March 8, 1990, he beat the famed former world champion Rafael Limón in Atlantic City by an eight-round unanimous decision.

Mitchell kept on winning, running his record up to 27-0 with sixteen knockouts, including a victory against former world title challenger Miguel Santana. He then fought former world champion Rocky Lockridge on April 22, 1992, winning a ten-round unanimous decision.

Mitchell had recorded a 31-0 record until he lost two fights in a row to begin 1994: one against future world champion Leavander Johnson in eight rounds, then to future two-time world lightweight champion Stevie Johnston in nine rounds. He did not lose another fight in the next seven years.

After six more wins in a row, including one over future world champion Terron Millett, Mitchell fought for the WBC continental Americas light welterweight title in Dallas, Texas on April 11, 1996. He won the title by knocking out Gilberto Floes in the second round.

On May 10, 1997, Mitchell defeated Jose Rafael Barboza by a twelve-round decision in Miami, Florida to win the WBA's Fedelatin belt in the same weight division. After two more victories, he got his first chance at winning a world title.

WBA light welterweight champion
On October 10, 1998, he beat Moroccan Khalid Rahilou by a twelve-round unanimous decision in Paris, France, becoming the WBA light welterweight champion.

Mitchell retained his world title four times, his last successful defense being against Puerto Rican Felix Flores on September 16, 2000, at Las Vegas. Mitchell was dropped in the first round, but he recovered and edged the challenger by two scores of 116-111 and one of 116-113.

First fight with Tszyu
After that fight, demand rose for a unification title bout between Mitchell and Kostya Tszyu of Australia, the WBC light welterweight champion.

The highly anticipated match took place in Las Vegas on February 3, 2001. The outcome was controversial, as Mitchell broke his knee early in the fight and he could not continue after round seven. Although Mitchell was not knocked out in a conventional way, this nevertheless counted as a knockout loss in his record.

Mitchell then fought eight bouts, winning each of them, including victories over former world champion Vince Phillips and winning the IBF super lightweight title against Lovemore N'Dou in Atlantic City New Jersey. Defending that title ounce in Manchester England. He also beat and became and the first person to have knocked down Ben Tackie.

Rematch with Tszyu

Negotiations for a rematch with Tszyu had been taking place long before the fights with the aforementioned rivals. Tszyu, however, had his own health problems, and the fight kept being cancelled. First scheduled for Australia and then for Moscow, the rematch finally took place on November 6, 2004, in Phoenix, Arizona. Mitchell was floored four times in the second bout with Tszyu before being stopped in round three, losing by knockout.

Losses to Mayweather and Williams
On November 19, 2005, Mitchell was defeated by Floyd Mayweather Jr. in their 147-lbs. non-title bout in Portland, Oregon. Mayweather dropped Mitchell in the third round with a straight right hand to the head, and again dropped him in the sixth with a hook to the body, ending the fight. During his most recent bout - against Paul Williams in Reno, Nevada, on August 19, 2006 - Mitchell was knocked down in the third round, and three times in the fourth round. Referee Richard Steele stopped the bout at 2:57 when Mitchell arose wobbly from the final knockdown. Mitchell retired for good shortly there after.

Mitchell finished his professional boxing career of 57 wins and 6 losses, with 30 knockout wins.

Professional boxing record

Awards
2011: Washington D.C. Lifetime Achievement Award
2012: Maryland Sports Hall of Fame inductee

References

External links

1970 births
Boxers from Washington, D.C.
Boxers from Maryland
Living people
Southpaw boxers
Light-welterweight boxers
World light-welterweight boxing champions
World Boxing Association champions
People from Takoma Park, Maryland
American male boxers
African-American boxers
Welterweight boxers
Lightweight boxers
Howard University alumni